Hypostomus bolivianus is a species of catfish in the family Loricariidae. It is native to South America, where it occurs in the Beni River basin in Bolivia, the country for which it is named. The species reaches 15 cm (5.9 inches) in total length and is believed to be a facultative air-breather.

References 

bolivianus
Fish described in 1924